The 2021 Morehead State Eagles football team represented Morehead State University in the 2021 NCAA Division I FCS football season as a member of the Pioneer Football League. They were led by ninth-year head coach Rob Tenyer and played their home games at Jayne Stadium.

Schedule

References

Morehead State
Morehead State Eagles football seasons
Morehead State Eagles football